The French Land Transport Accident Investigation Bureau (abbreviated BEA-TT) is an agency of the French government formed in 2004 and charged with the investigation into accidents involving all forms of land transport, including railways, urban guided transportation systems (metros, trams), cable-hauled transport systems, road transport (heavy goods vehicles, and public transport by coach and bus), and canals and other navigable inland waterways.

History

Prior to the formation of the BEA-TT, the government minister with responsibility for transportation would set up ad hoc investigation commissions, for example after the 1988 Paris-Gare de Lyon rail accident and 1999 Mont Blanc tunnel fire. These commissions were supported by the Conseil Général des Ponts et Chaussées (CGPC, "Civil Engineering General Council").

The CGPC's experience, particularly following the Mont Blanc tunnel fire, showed there was a need for a new legal framework that guaranteed investigators access to sites, recordings and information covered by commercial confidentiality or pre-trial non-disclosure agreements. An Act of parliament passed on 3 January 2002 supplied the legal basis for technical investigations and reaffirms and mandates the investigatory principals of independence, and commits to the publishing of the report. The BEA-TT was founded by a decree on 26 January 2004, with the right of access to all elements useful to an investigation, even those covered by non disclosure or confidentiality requirements such as those pre-trial or for commercial and medical reasons.

Investigations 
 Brétigny-sur-Orge train crash

See also

 Bureau d'Enquêtes et d'Analyses pour la Sécurité de l'Aviation Civile (BEA)
 Bureau d'Enquêtes sur les Evénements de Mer (BEAmer)

 Road Safety Investigation Branch (Great-Britain)

References

External links

Official website 

Government agencies of France
Rail accident investigators
Transport safety organizations
2004 establishments in France